The Curtiss  H-1640 Chieftain was an unusual American 12-cylinder radial aero engine designed and built by the Curtiss Aeroplane and Motor Company in the mid-1920s.

Design and development
The H-1640 was an air-cooled 12 cylinder two-row radial with the cylinder rows aligned rather than staggered as in most multi-row radials. One piece cylinder heads shared a single overhead camshaft and the propeller was directly driven. By aligning the cylinders the diameter of the engine was less than more conventional radial engines, and it was thought that the use of a Townend ring could make the engine more aerodynamically efficient than an inline engine. The engine first ran in 1927.

The H-1640 was the first airworthy 'inline radial' and was sponsored for flight testing in a range of aircraft by the U.S. Government. Among the types selected were the Thomas-Morse XP-13 and the Curtiss XO-18.  Cooling problems with the rear cylinders caused the project to be canceled with few production engines being built.

A similar engine is the Bristol Hydra although this engine had 16 aligned cylinders, forming an octagon. Further similar engines are the Armstrong Siddeley Hyena and the much larger Armstrong Siddeley Deerhound.

Applications

Curtiss XP-22 Hawk
Curtiss YP-20
Curtiss P-6 Hawk
Thomas-Morse XP-13 Viper

Specifications (H-1640)

See also

References

Notes

Bibliography

 Gunston, Bill. World Encyclopaedia of Aero Engines. Cambridge, England. Patrick Stephens Limited, 1989. 

H-1640
Radial engines
1920s aircraft piston engines
Abandoned military aircraft engine projects of the United States